Carex ecostata is a tussock-forming perennial in the family Cyperaceae. It is native to Nagaland, Assam, India.

See also
List of Carex species

References

ecostata
Flora of Assam (region)
Plants described in 1894
Taxa named by Charles Baron Clarke